William Abrams ( – 6 February 1844) was a businessman with a military and judicial career in New Brunswick.

Abrams was born in England and emigrated to New Brunswick in 1819 where he started a business funded by himself and five partners in Scotland. He and his family settled in the Miramichi region and he ran a business there, first with partners and later on his own, until his death. He founded a successful shipyard at Rosebank.

William was active in the community and served as a justice of the peace and a justice of the Inferior Court of Common Pleas in New Brunswick. Both positions were important to the area. As well, he brought needed banking services to the area and promoted the foundation of the local Chamber of Commerce. He was one of the most important of the early shipbuilders in New Brunswick and, as such, was important to the developing economy of the time.

External links 
 Biography at the Dictionary of Canadian Biography Online

1780s births
1844 deaths
English emigrants to pre-Confederation New Brunswick
Colony of New Brunswick judges